The 2003 Newfoundland and Labrador general election was held on October 21, 2003, to elect the 48 members of the 45th General Assembly of Newfoundland and Labrador. The election was called on September 29 by Premier Roger Grimes of the Liberal Party of Newfoundland and Labrador.

Results

This election marked only the third change of government in the 54 years since the province joined Canada.  The Liberals, led by Roger Grimes, were soundly defeated by the Danny Williams-led Progressive Conservative Party, who took almost three-quarters of the seats in the House of Assembly and well over half of the popular vote. The Liberals lost seven of their 17 Cabinet ministers, along with the Speaker of the House, from the preceding government.  Jack Harris and the New Democrats hopes to increase their seat total from two were frustrated, although their incumbents were re-elected.

Results by party

|- style="background-color:#CCCCCC"
!rowspan="2" colspan="2" style="text-align:left;" |Party
!rowspan="2" style="text-align:left;" |Party leader
!rowspan="2"|Candidates
!colspan="4" style="text-align:center;" |Seats
!colspan="3" style="text-align:center;" |Popular vote
|- style="background-color:#CCCCCC"
| style="text-align:center;" |1999
| style="text-align:center;" |Dissol.
| style="text-align:center;" |2003
| style="text-align:center;" |Change
| style="text-align:center;" |#
| style="text-align:center;" |%
| style="text-align:center;" |Change

|Danny Williams
| style="text-align:right;" |48
| style="text-align:right;" |14
| style="text-align:right;" |19
! style="text-align:right;" |34
| style="text-align:right;" |+78.9%
| style="text-align:right;" |162,949
| style="text-align:right;" |58.71%
| style="text-align:right;" |+17.94%

| style="text-align:left;" |Roger Grimes
| style="text-align:right;" |48
| style="text-align:right;" |32
| style="text-align:right;" |27
! style="text-align:right;" |12
| style="text-align:right;" |-55.6%
| style="text-align:right;" |91,729
| style="text-align:right;" |33.05%
| style="text-align:right;" |-16.57%

| style="text-align:left;" |Jack Harris
| style="text-align:right;" |34
| style="text-align:right;" |2
| style="text-align:right;" |2
! style="text-align:right;" |2
| style="text-align:right;" |-
| style="text-align:right;" |19,048
| style="text-align:right;" |6.86%
| style="text-align:right;" |-1.37%

| colspan=2 style="text-align:left;" |Independent and no affiliation
| style="text-align:right;" |13
| style="text-align:right;" |-
| style="text-align:right;" |-
! style="text-align:right;" |-
| style="text-align:right;" |-
| style="text-align:right;" |3,812
| style="text-align:right;" |1.38%
| style="text-align:right;" |-%
|-
! style="text-align:left;" colspan=3 |Total
! style="text-align:right;" |143
! style="text-align:right;" |48
! style="text-align:right;" |48
! style="text-align:right;" |48
! style="text-align:right;" |  -
! style="text-align:right;" |277,538
! style="text-align:right;" |100.00%
! style="text-align:right;" |  
|}

Results by region

Results by riding

 Bold denotes a Cabinet minister or party leader.
 † denotes a retiring MHA.

St. John's

|-
|bgcolor=whitesmoke|Kilbride
||
|Ed Byrne  5,315
|
|Joe Wadden  1,071
|
|David Reynolds  404
|
|
||
|Ed Byrne

|-
|bgcolor=whitesmoke|Signal Hill—Quidi Vidi
|
|Karen Carroll  2,221
|
|Ray O'Neill  391
||
|Jack Harris  2,456
|
|
||
|Jack Harris
|-
|bgcolor=whitesmoke|St. John's Centre
||
|Shawn Skinner  3,349
|
|Joan Marie Aylward  1,763
|
|Carol Cantwell  956
|
|
||
|Joan Marie Aylward
|-
|bgcolor=whitesmoke|St. John's East
||
|John Ottenheimer  4,151
|
|George Murphy 862
|
|Bruce Clark  841
|
|Steve Durant (Ind.)  66
||
|John Ottenheimer
|-
|bgcolor=whitesmoke|St. John's North
||
|Bob Ridgley  3,107
|
|Jeff Brace  1,433
|
|Liam Walsh  820
|
|
||
|Lloyd Mathews †
|-
|bgcolor=whitesmoke|St. John's South
||
|Tom Osborne  4,532
|
|Dennis O'Keefe  756
|
|Tom McGinnis  676
|
|
||
|Tom Osborne
|-
|bgcolor=whitesmoke|St. John's West
||
|Sheila Osborne  4,557
|
|Tom Hann  1,292
|
|Raj Sharan  460
|
|
||
|Sheila Osborne

|-
|bgcolor=whitesmoke|Virginia Waters
||
|Kathy Dunderdale  4,193
|
|Walter Noel  2,358
|
|Dave Sullivan  666
|
|
||
|Walter Noel

|}

St. John's suburbs

|-
|-
|bgcolor=whitesmoke|Cape St. Francis
||
|Jack Byrne  5,604
|
|Bill Tapper  1,294
|
|Ralph Tapper  980
|
|
||
|Jack Byrne
|-
|bgcolor=whitesmoke|Conception Bay East and Bell Island
||
|Dianne Whalen  4,147
|
|Jim Walsh  1,870
|
|Ken Kavanaugh  1,180
|
|Doug Cole (Ind.)  171
||
|Jim Walsh
|-
|bgcolor=whitesmoke|Conception Bay South
||
|Terry French  5,606
|
|Sheina Lerman  372
|
|Andy Lewis  768
|
|
||
|Terry French
|-
|bgcolor=whitesmoke|Mount Pearl
||
|Dave Denine  5,662
|
|Wayne Ralph  798
|
|Roy Locke  504
|
|
||
|Julie Bettney †
|-
|bgcolor=whitesmoke|Topsail
||
|Elizabeth Marshall  5,354 
|
|Ralph Wiseman  2,354
|
|Michael Kehoe  472
|
|
||
|Ralph Wiseman
|-
|bgcolor=whitesmoke|Waterford Valley
||
|Harvey Hodder  4,569
|
|Averill Baker  1,277
|
|Justin Locke  410
|
|
||
|Harvey Hodder
|}

Avalon and Burin peninsulas

|-
|bgcolor=whitesmoke|Bellevue
|
|Joan Cleary  2,523
||
|Percy Barrett  2,623
|
|Michael Fahey  299
|
|
||
|Percy Barrett
|-
|bgcolor=whitesmoke|Burin—Placentia West
||
|Clyde Jackman  3,450
|
|Sam Synard  2,133
|
|Wayne Butler  684
|
|
||
|Mary Hodder †
|-
|bgcolor=whitesmoke|Carbonear—Harbour Grace
|
|John Babb  3,165
||
|George Sweeney  3,699
|
|
|
|
||
|George Sweeney
|-
|bgcolor=whitesmoke|Ferryland
||
|Loyola Sullivan  5,167
|
|Andrea Kavanagh  504
|
|Lois Martin  309
|
|Pilar Riego-Hickey (Ind.)  11
||
|Loyola Sullivan
|-
|bgcolor=whitesmoke|Grand Bank
|
|Darin King  3,058
||
|Judy Foote  3,101
|
|Bill Wakeley  136
|
|
||
|Judy Foote
|-
|bgcolor=whitesmoke|Harbour Main—Whitbourne
||
|Tom Hedderson  4,769
|
|Fred Akerman  1,482
|
|Eugene Conway  493
|
|
||
|Tom Hedderson
|-
|bgcolor=whitesmoke|Placentia and St. Mary's 
||
|Fabian Manning  3,746
|
|Kevin Power  1,812
|
|Janet Stringer  152
|
|
||
|Fabian Manning
|-
|bgcolor=whitesmoke|Port de Grave 
|
|Clarence Gosse  2,374
||
|Roland Butler  3,983
|
|
|
|
||
|Roland Butler
|-
|bgcolor=whitesmoke|Trinity—Bay de Verde 
||
|Charlene Johnson  4,091
|
|Lloyd Snow  2,095
|
|Victoria Harnum  287
|
|
||
|Lloyd Snow
|}

Central Newfoundland

|-
|bgcolor=whitesmoke|Baie Verte
||
|Paul Shelley  3,045
|
|Maurice Budgell  927
|
|
|
|William Day (Ind.)  114
||
|Paul Shelley
|-
|bgcolor=whitesmoke|Bonavista North
||
|Harry Harding  3,384
|
|Churence Rogers  2,301
|
|Howard E. Parsons  116
|
|
||
|Harry Harding
|-
|bgcolor=whitesmoke|Bonavista South
||
|Roger Fitzgerald  4,354
|
|Betty Fitzgerald  938
|
|Sam Kelly  179
|
|
||
|Roger Fitzgerald

|-
|bgcolor=whitesmoke|Exploits
|
|Clayton Forsey  2,346
||
|Roger Grimes  3,218
|
|John L. Whelan  168
|
|
||
|Roger Grimes

|-
|bgcolor=whitesmoke|Gander
||
|Kevin O'Brien  3,621
|
|Dianne Crewe  1,930
|
|Steve Johnson  348
|
|
||
|Sandra Kelly †
|-
|bgcolor=whitesmoke|Grand Falls—Buchans
|
|Paula Flood  2,331
||
|Anna Thistle  3,921
|
|Gerry Tobin  370
|
|
||
|Anna Thistle
|-
|bgcolor=whitesmoke|Lewisporte
||
|Tom Rideout  3,504
|
|Todd Manuel  1,275
|
|
|
|Garry Vatcher (Ind.)  159
||
|Tom Rideout
|-
|bgcolor=whitesmoke|Terra Nova
||
|Paul Oram  3,114
|
|Tom Lush  2,614
|
|Herbert Ralph  218
|
|
||
|Tom Lush
|-
|bgcolor=whitesmoke|Trinity North
||
|Ross Wiseman  4,126
|
|Kathryn Small  1,640
|
|Howard W. Duffett  340
|
|
||
|Ross Wiseman
|-
|bgcolor=whitesmoke|Twillingate and Fogo
|
|Derrick Dalley  2,334
||
|Gerry Reid  2,941
|
|
|
|
||
|Gerry Reid
|-
|bgcolor=whitesmoke|Windsor—Springdale
||
|Ray Hunter  3,488
|
|Barry J. Oake  1,826
|
|Clar Jacobs  138
|
|Elmer Anthony (Ind.)  145
||
|Ray Hunter
|}

Western and Southern Newfoundland

|-
|bgcolor=whitesmoke|Bay of Islands
|
|Mike Monaghan  2,760
||
|Eddie Joyce  2,907
|
|Dave Quigley  214
|
|
||
|Eddie Joyce
|-
|bgcolor=whitesmoke|Burgeo and La Poile
|
|Stephen MacKenzie  1,008
||
|Kelvin Parsons  4,233
|
|
|
|
||
|Kelvin Parsons
|-
|bgcolor=whitesmoke|Fortune Bay—Cape La Hune
|
|Andrew Colford  2,044
||
|Oliver Langdon  2,880
|
|
|
|
||
|Oliver Langdon
|-
|bgcolor=whitesmoke|Humber East
||
|Tom Marshall  3,976
|
|Bob Mercer  2,624
|
|
|
|
||
|Bob Mercer
|-
|bgcolor=whitesmoke|Humber Valley
||
|Kathy Goudie  2,796
|
|Dwight Ball  2,507
|
|
|
|
||
|Rick Woodford †
|-
|bgcolor=whitesmoke|Humber West
||
|Danny Williams  3,823
|
|Edward Buckle  1,533
|
|Matthew Robbins  207
|
|
||
|Danny Williams
|-
|bgcolor=whitesmoke|Port au Port
||
|Jim Hodder  3,101
|
|Gerald Smith  2,378
|
|
|
|Frederick G. Ollerhead (Ind.)  84
||
|Gerald Smith
|-
|bgcolor=whitesmoke|St. Barbe
||
|Wallace Young  2,948
|
|Ralph Payne  1,577
|
|Holly Patey  293
|
|
||
|Wallace Young
|-
|bgcolor=whitesmoke|St. George's—Stephenville East
||
|Joan Burke  2,927
|
|Ron Dawe  2,464
|
|
|
|Nancy Critchley (Ind.)  170
||
|Kevin Aylward †
|-
|bgcolor=whitesmoke|The Straits - White Bay North
||
|Trevor Taylor  3,133
|
|Don McDonald  1,802
|
|
|
|Ford Michelmore (Ind.)  78
||
|Trevor Taylor
|}

Labrador

|-
|bgcolor=whitesmoke|Cartwright—L'Anse au Clair
|
|Dennis Normore  804
||
|Yvonne Jones  1,514
|
|
|
|Frank Pye (Lab.)  206
||
|Yvonne Jones
|-
|bgcolor=whitesmoke|Labrador West
|
|Graham Letto  1,142
|
|Doris Sacrey  423
||
|Randy Collins  2,762
|
|Ern Condon (Lab.)  631
||
|Randy Collins
|-
|bgcolor=whitesmoke|Lake Melville
||
|John Hickey  1,778
|
|Ken Anthony  1,126
|
|Barbara Stickley  129
|
|Brandon Pardy (Lab.)  1,485
||
|Ernie McLean †
|-
|bgcolor=whitesmoke|Torngat Mountains
|
|Winston White  352
||
|Wally Andersen  934
|
|
|
|Lucy Jararuse (Lab.)  69
||
|Wally Andersen
|}

By-elections since the general election

Exploits (resignation of Roger Grimes), June 23, 2005:

 
|PC
|Clayton Forsey
|align="right"|2,605
|align="right"|55.2
|align="right"|
|-
 
|Liberal
|George Saunders
|align="right"|1,958
|align="right"|41.5
|align="right"|
|-

| style="width: 130px" |NDP
|John Whelan
|align="right"|159
|align="right"|3.4
|align="right"|
|- bgcolor="white"
!align="left" colspan=3|Total
!align="right"|4,722
!align="right"|100%
!align="right"|
|}

Placentia and St. Mary's (resignation of Fabian Manning), February 21, 2006:

 
|PC
|Felix Collins
|align="right"|2,247
|align="right"|46.3
|align="right"|
|-

|Independent
|Nick Careen
|align="right"|1,641
|align="right"|33.8
|align="right"|
|-
 
|Liberal
|Kevin Power
|align="right"|931
|align="right"|19.2
|align="right"|

|- bgcolor="white"
!align="left" colspan=3|Total
!align="right"|4,850
!align="right"|
!align="right"|
|}

Signal Hill-Quidi Vidi (resignation of Jack Harris), November 1, 2006:

|-

| style="width: 130px" |NDP
|Lorraine Michael
|align="right"|1,968
|align="right"|55.23
|align="right"|+6.77
 
|PC
|Jerome Kennedy
|align="right"|1,595
|align="right"|44.77
|align="right"|+0.95
|- bgcolor="white"
!align="left" colspan=3|Total
!align="right"|3,563
!align="right"|100%
!align="right"|
|}

Ferryland (resignation of Loyola Sullivan), February 8, 2007:

 
|PC
|Keith Hutchings
|align="right"|2,770
|align="right"|75.52
|align="right"|-10.73
|-
 
|Liberal
|Kevin Bennett
|align="right"|715
|align="right"|19.49
|align="right"|+11.08
|-

| style="width: 130px" |NDP
|Rick Boland
|align="right"|183
|align="right"|4.99
|align="right"|-0.17
|- bgcolor="white"
!align="left" colspan=3|Total
!align="right"|3,668
!align="right"|100%
!align="right"|
|}

Kilbride (resignation of Ed Byrne), February 8, 2007:

 
|PC
|John Dinn
|align="right"|2,744
|align="right"|78.83
|align="right"|+0.55
|-
 
|Liberal
|Bob Clarke
|align="right"|508
|align="right"|14.59
|align="right"|-1.18
|-

| style="width: 130px" |NDP
|Gemma Schlamp-Hickey
|align="right"|229
|align="right"|6.58
|align="right"|+0.63
|- bgcolor="white"
!align="left" colspan=3|Total
!align="right"|3,481
!align="right"|100%
!align="right"|
|}

Port au Port (resignation of Jim Hodder), February 8, 2007:

 
|PC
|Tony Cornect
|align="right"|2,701
|align="right"|61.99
|align="right"|+6.25
|-
 
|Liberal
|Mark Felix
|align="right"|1,521
|align="right"|34.91
|align="right"|-7.84
|-

| style="width: 130px" |NDP
|Paul O'Keefe
|align="right"|135
|align="right"|3.90
|align="right"|*
|- bgcolor="white"
!align="left" colspan=3|Total
!align="right"|4,357
!align="right"|100%
!align="right"|
|}

Humber Valley (resignation of Kathy Goudie), February 13, 2007:

|-
 
|Liberal
|Dwight Ball
|align="right"|2,153
|align="right"|48.70
|align="right"|+1.26
 
|PC
|Darryl Kelly
|align="right"|2,146
|align="right"|48.54
|align="right"|-4.02
|-

| style="width: 130px" |NDP
|Shelley Senior
|align="right"|122
|align="right"|2.76
|align="right"|*
|- bgcolor="white"
!align="left" colspan=3|Total
!align="right"|4,421
!align="right"|100%
!align="right"|
|}

See also 
2007 Newfoundland and Labrador provincial by-elections
45th General Assembly of Newfoundland and Labrador
List of Newfoundland and Labrador General Assemblies
List of Newfoundland and Labrador political parties

References

Further reading

External links

General resources
Government of Newfoundland and Labrador
Elections Newfoundland and Labrador
CBC - Newfoundland & Labrador Votes 2003

Parties
Progressive Conservative Party of Newfoundland and Labrador  (see also Conservative Party of Canada)
Liberal Party of Newfoundland and Labrador (see also Liberal Party of Canada)
Newfoundland and Labrador New Democratic Party (see also New Democratic Party)
Labrador Party

Newfoundland and Labrador general
Elections in Newfoundland and Labrador
2003 in Newfoundland and Labrador
October 2003 events in Canada